Mercedes Paz and Rene Simpson won in the final 7–5, 6–2 against Laura Golarsa and Irina Spîrlea.

Seeds
Champion seeds are indicated in bold text while text in italics indicates the round in which those seeds were eliminated.

 Laura Golarsa /  Irina Spîrlea (final)
 Mercedes Paz /  Rene Simpson (champions)
 Sandra Cecchini /  Isabelle Demongeot (quarterfinals)
 Nanne Dahlman /  Laura Garrone (first round)

Draw

External links
 1995 Zagreb Open Doubles Draw

Croatian Bol Ladies Open
1995 WTA Tour